Stephan Herminghaus is a German physicist. He received a PhD in Physics from the University of Mainz in 1989. His postdoctoral stay was at the IBM Research Center in San Jose, California (USA), in 1990 . He completed his habilitation at the University of Konstanz in 1994 and was the head of an independent research group at the MPI for Colloids and Interfaces, Berlin, from 1996 until 1999. He then became a full professor at the University of Ulm from 1999 until 2003. Since 2003, he has been a director at the Max Planck Institute for Dynamics and Self-Organization, Göttingen. Since 2005, he has an additional appointment as an adjunct professor at the University of Göttingen. Further, he was appointed as Professeur Invité at Université Paris VI for the winter term 2006/07.

References

External links

Video 
 Video on Stephan Herminghaus's research (Latest Thinking)

21st-century German physicists
Living people
Year of birth missing (living people)
Johannes Gutenberg University Mainz alumni
IBM people
Academic staff of the University of Konstanz
Max Planck Society alumni
Academic staff of the University of Göttingen
Max Planck Institute directors